James J. Sullivan Jr. is an American lawyer specializing in occupational safety and health law at the law firm of Cozen O'Connor. He previously was a member of the Occupational Safety and Health Review Commission, from August 28, 2017 through March 23, 2021.  Sullivan served as chairman of the Commission from July 22, 2019 through January 25, 2021. Before joining government, Sullivan was in private practice, representing employers and businesses at law  firms, including Cozen O'Connor and Buchanan, Ingersoll & Rooney. He was the management co-chair of the Occupational Safety and Health Law Committee of the American Bar Association's Labor Law Section from 2014 to 2017. Sullivan was the vice president of labor and employment law and deputy general counsel for Comcast from 2000 to 2002.

References

Living people
Pennsylvania State University alumni
Georgetown University Law Center alumni
21st-century American lawyers
Trump administration personnel
Year of birth missing (living people)
Comcast people
American labor lawyers
Occupational safety and health law
Place of birth missing (living people)